Pekka Hämäläinen (25 October 1938 – 4 June 2013) was a Finnish association football player and administrator.

Career
Hämäläinen played for HIFK, winning the national championship in 1961, and playing for them in the 1962–63 European Cup.

He was President of the Football Association of Finland between 1997 and 2009.

References

1938 births
2013 deaths
Finnish footballers
Association football executives
HIFK Fotboll players
Mestaruussarja players
Association football defenders
Football Federation of Finland executives